Edward Joseph "Petey" Perot (born April 28, 1957) is a former professional American football offensive lineman.  He started in Super Bowl XV for the Philadelphia Eagles.  Perot played college football at Northwestern State University and was drafted in the second round of the 1979 NFL Draft by the Eagles. He also played for the New Orleans Saints in 1985.  

Following his playing career, Perot coached at Southern Miss and Louisiana Tech.

References

1957 births
Living people
Sportspeople from Natchitoches, Louisiana
Players of American football from Louisiana
American football offensive guards
Northwestern State Demons football players
Philadelphia Eagles players
New Orleans Saints players
Louisiana Tech Bulldogs football coaches
Southern Miss Golden Eagles football coaches